The Consulate General of the United States, Shenyang is one of seven American diplomatic and consular posts in the People's Republic of China. It is located in Heping District, Shenyang, Liaoning.

History

The U.S. Consulate in Shenyang was opened in 1904. It was originally housed in two abandoned Chinese temples, "Temples 'Yi Kung Ssu' and 'Scwang Chen Ssu' located outside the Little West Commerce Gate." Sometime before 1924, the Consulate moved to No. 1 Wu Wei Lu, a building which used to house the Russian Consulate. At that time, the United States had several other Consulates in Northeast China, including in Harbin and Dalian. These appear to have been closed by World War II. The Shenyang Consulate was able to continue operations for most of the war but closed in 1949 after the new Chinese Communist Party authorities had imprisoned the remaining consulate staff in their offices for almost a year before expelling them. In 1984, five years after the United States recognized formally established diplomatic relations with the government in Beijing, the Consulate reopened; today it plays a key part in the management of the close relationship the United States has with northeast China.

Consul generals

Nancy Abella, 2019–present
Gregory May 2017–2019
Scott Weinhold, 2013-2017
Sean Stein, 2010–2013
Stephen Wickman, 2007-2010
David Kornbluth, 2004-2007
Mark Kennon, 2002-2004
Angus Taylor Simmons, 1999-2002
Gerard R. Pascua (including 1994)
Morton Holbrook III, 1990-1993
Carl Eugene "Gene" Dorris, 1987-1990
John A. "Jack" Froebe, 1986-1987
James Hall, 1984-1986

See also

 List of diplomatic missions of the United States
 U.S. Embassy Beijing
 U.S. Consulate General Chengdu
 U.S. Consulate General Guangzhou
 U.S. Consulate General Shanghai
 U.S. Consulate General Wuhan
 Americans in China

References

"Manchurian Raids Creating Terror". The New York Times. June 20, 1933: pp. 5.
Associated Press. "American Golfers in Mukden Carry Guns to Resist Bandits". The New York Times. September 23, 1932: pp. 5.
"Manchuria Railway Raided 42 Times A Day". The New York Times. August 23, 1932: pp. 7
Abend, Hallet. "U.S. Consul Beaten by Japanese Patrol in Mukden Street". The New York Times. January 4, 1932: pp. 1.
"U.S. Consuls in Mukden Drive Off Crazed Soldier". The New York Times. July 17, 1934: pp. 13.
Song Lijun. "POWs' painful memories of war". China Daily. Clipping does not have a page number or date.

Diplomatic missions of the United States
Shenyang
China–United States relations
Diplomatic missions in China